German and Jewish (Ashkenazic): from Middle High German herre German Herr ‘master lord’ applied as a nickname for someone who gave himself airs and behaved in a lordly manner or as an occupational name for someone in the service of the lord of the manor. As a Jewish surname it is often artificial. This surname is also found in Switzerland (Basel area) France (Alsace and Lorraine) and Hungary.

Herr is a German surname. Notable people with the surname include:
Aaron Herr (born 1981), American baseball player
Alexander Herr (born 1978), German ski jumper
Anita Herr (born 1987), Hungarian handball player
Beth Herr (born 1964), American tennis player
Claudius Herr (1775 – 1838), Austrian painter
Dominique Herr (born 1965), Swiss footballer
Howard Herr (born 1962), South African tennis player
Hugh Herr (born 1964), American rock climber, engineer, and biophysicist
Jim Herr (1924 – 2012),  American businessman
John Knowles Herr (1878 – 1955), American general officer
Lois Herr (born 1941), American politician
Matt Herr (born 1976), American ice hockey player
Michael Herr (1940 – 2016), American writer
Michel Herr (born 1949), Belgian musician
Orsolya Herr (born 1984), Hungarian handball player
Spencer Herr (born 1974), American artist
Tom Herr (born 1956), American baseball player
Traugott Herr (1890 – 1976), German general

German-language surnames
Surnames from nicknames